Đakovo  is a town in the region of Slavonia, Croatia. Đakovo is the centre of the fertile and rich Đakovo region.

Etymology
The Hungarian diák word has the same Greek origin and it is uncertain whether the name came directly from Greek, Hungarian, or local Slavic form.

History

In Roman antiquity the settlement Certissia stood on the same spot until it disappeared during the Migration Period.

The settlement's first mention in historical documents dates from 1239 when Béla IV of Hungary granted it to the Diocese of Bosnia, and the Bishop moved his seat here in 1246. The predecessor to the newer St. Peter's Cathedral was built in 1355. In 1374 the settlement is documented under the name Dyacou. Croatian rebels in 1386 on 25 July captured Queen Mary of Hungary and her mother Elizabeth near the settlement.

The Ottoman rule over Đakovo started in 1536 and lasted for nearly 150 years. It was a kaza administrative center in Sanjak of Pojega and was known as "Yakova" during this period. In 1805 a Lipizzan horse herd was evacuated to Đakovo when Napoleon invaded Austria & Hungary and a part of the herd remained permanently there. In a 1910 census the settlement's total population of 6304 was made of 4894 Croatians, 890 Germans, 249 Hungarians and 164 Serbians. In the late 19th and early 20th century the settlement was a district capital in the Virovitica County of the Kingdom of Croatia-Slavonia within the Lands of the Crown of Saint Stephen. From 1 December 1941 until 7 July 1942 the Ustaše established and operated the Đakovo internment camp, mostly for Jewish, Roma and Serb women and children.

Geography
It is located near the A5 motorway, at the intersection of the D7 state road to Osijek, the arterial roads D38 to Požega, D46 to Vinkovci and the connecting road D515 to Našice.

Demographics
According to the 2011 census, there is a total of 27,745 residents in the administrative area, of which 19,491 in Đakovo itself. The town consists of following settlements:
 Budrovci, population 1,260
 Đakovo, population 19,491
 Đurđanci, population 425
 Ivanovci Đakovački, population 580
 Kuševac, population 1,028
 Novi Perkovci, population 246
 Piškorevci, population 1,907
 Selci Đakovački, population 1,796
 Široko Polje, population 1,012

Economy
Chief occupations include farming, livestock breeding, leather and wool processing; horse selection centre; major industries are wood processing (furniture), textiles, chemicals and food processing, building material, printing and tourism.

Culture

The Cathedral basilica of St. Peter in Đakovo is the town's most famous landmark and the most important sacral object, not only in Đakovo but also throughout the whole region of Slavonia. The cathedral was built 1866-1882 under Josip Juraj Strossmayer, then the Catholic bishop of Đakovo and Srijem. The landscaped park from the 19th century near the bishop's palace is a horticultural monument under special protection as well as the nearby Small Park (Mali Park) dating from the turn of the 19th/20th century.

The central traditional event is called Đakovački vezovi (Đakovo Embroidery). It is a folklore show of the regions Slavonia and Baranja that is organized yearly in the beginning of July, and it presents traditional folk costumes, folklore dancing and singing groups, customs. The cathedral hosts choirs, opera artists, and art exhibitions are organized in the exhibition salon. The horse and wedding wagon show is a special part of the program. During the sports program, pure-bred white Lipizzaner horses can be seen on the racecourse. They come from the horse-breeding centre in Ivandvor, which has been breeding horses ever since 1506.

The town and the surroundings offer many sports and recreation facilities, such as tennis courts, racecourse, gym, swimming pool, etc. The lakes Jošava, Mlinac, Borovik as well as fishponds, backwaters and canals offer fine angling opportunities. High and low game hunting is possible in the immediate surroundings or farther on the Dilj and mountain to the southwest. The traditional Slavonian cuisine, famous for its meat specialities (kulin smoked sausage, kobasica sausages, smoked ham), venison and freshwater fish dishes are offered both in Đakovo and its surroundings. Of particular interest are the exquisite wines of the Đakovo region: Weissburgunder, Traminer and Riesling.

International relations

Twin towns – Sister cities
Đakovo is twinned with:
  Makarska, Croatia
  Sinj, Croatia
  Tomislavgrad, Bosnia and Herzegovina
  Malgersdorf, Germany
  Kirchenthumbach, Germany
  Óbuda-Békásmegyer, Hungary

Notable people
Domagoj Duvnjak, handball player
Branka Raunig, archaeologist and museum curator
Ivan Vargić, footballer

References

External links

 City of Đakovo 
 Đakovo Profile Page from the Osijek-Baranja County Website 

 
Cities and towns in Croatia
Slavonia
Virovitica County
13th-century establishments in Croatia
1239 establishments in Europe